World SF is a loose term for international, or global, speculative fiction, predominantly from the non-Anglophone world. An early use of the term came with the establishment of World SF, an association of SF professionals in 1976. According to the third edition of the Encyclopedia of Science Fiction, the term was partly revived by the author Lavie Tidhar, leading to the establishment of the World SF Blog, which ran 2009-2013. Early on, the Filipino blogger Charles A. Tan became involved with the blog, contributing much of the original material - including interviews with authors, reviews and the occasional editorial, including the important World SF: Our Possible Future in 2012. Tan was himself twice nominated for the World Fantasy Award, for his own blog, Bibliophile Stalker, and has edited several anthologies of Filipino speculative fiction.

For his work on the promotion of global speculative fiction, Tidhar was nominated for a World Fantasy Award in 2011, and won a 2012 BSFA Award for Non-Fiction in 2012. The Polish SF scholar Konrad Walewski argued that "Tidhar deliberately utilized the term World SF as a specific act of disagreement and dissatisfaction with what he considered to be the gradual ossification of the original organization".

In parallel, Tidhar edited three anthologies of World SF, The Apex Book of World SF series, between 2009-2014. Significant authors featured in the series included Lauren Beukes (South Africa), Zoran Živković (Serbia), Aliette de Bodard (France), Hannu Rajaniemi (Finland), Xia Jia (China), Karin Tidbeck (Sweden), Guy Hasson (Israel), Tunku Halim (Malaysia), Samit Basu (India), Ekaterina Sedia (Russia) and many others. The series was continued in 2015 with a fourth volume edited by Mahvesh Murad, with Tidhar remaining as series editor.

World SF should not be confused with WorldCon which, despite its name, is a predominantly (though not exclusively) American institution.

Further reading

Anthologies

 The Apex Book of World SF, ed. Lavie Tidhar, Apex Book Company, 2009
 The Apex Book of World SF 2, ed. Lavie Tidhar, Apex Book Company, 2012
 The Apex Book of World SF 3, ed. Lavie Tidhar, Apex Book Company, 2014
 The Apex Book of World SF 4, ed. Mahvesh Murad, Apex Book Company, 2015
 Three Messages and A Warning: Contemporary Mexican Short Stories of the Fantastic, ed.Eduardo Jiménez Mayo and Chris N. Brown, Small Beer Press, 2012
 The Future is Japanese, ed. Nick Mamatas, Haikasoru, 2012

Novels

 Turbulence, Samit Basu, Titan Books, 2012
 The Secret History of Moscow, Ekaterina Sedia, Prime Books, 2007
 Zoo City, Lauren Beukes, Angry Robot, 2010
 All You Need is Kill,  Hiroshi Sakurazaka, Haikasoru, 2009 (basis for the Edge of Tomorrow)
 Sunburnt Faces, Shimon Adaf, PS Publishing 2013

Short story collections
 Jagganath, Karin Tidbeck, Cheeky Frawg, 2012

References

Science fiction